Consenting Adults is a 2007 BBC Four television film which portrays the events of the Wolfenden Committee, chaired by Sir John Wolfenden. The film is set in the 1950s and depicts social attitudes towards homosexuality in Britain at that time, while also focusing on Wolfenden and his homosexual son Jeremy Wolfenden.

The Committee first met on 15 September 1954 and published its report on 4 September 1957, recommending that "homosexual behaviour between consenting adults in private should no longer be a criminal offence". The report led to the passage of the Sexual Offences Act 1967, which partially decriminalised homosexuality in England and Wales.

The film was commissioned as part of a season of programming marking the 40th anniversary of the partial decriminalisation of homosexuality in England and Wales in 1967.

Cast
Charles Dance as John Wolfenden
Sean Biggerstaff as Jeremy Wolfenden
David Bamber as  Dr Carl Winter
Samantha Bond as Jill Wolfenden
Dallas Campbell as Sergeant Harry
Mark Gatiss as Police Constable Butcher
Paul Kendrick as Clive
Jamie Martin as Colin Parker
Charles Reston as Michael
Matt Ryan as Charley Bullard
Mel Smith as Maxwell Fyfe
Tim Wallers as Spellman
Colin Stinton as Alfred Kinsey

Reception
The film was nominated for BAFTA Scotland’s Best Drama Award on 18 November 2007, and Sean Biggerstaff won BAFTA Scotland's Award for Best Actor (Television).

External links
 BBC Four program description
 

LGBT history in the United Kingdom
2007 television specials
BBC television dramas
2007 drama films
LGBT-related drama films
2007 LGBT-related films
2007 films
2000s British films
British drama television films
2000s English-language films